James Gordon Meade Jr. (February 28, 1914 – August 7, 1977) was an American football player and coach and college athletics administrator. He played professionally as a halfback in the National Football League (NFL) for the Washington Redskins from 1939 to 1945.  Meade played college football and lacrosse at the University of Maryland.

After serving as a paratrooper in World War II, Meade was the backfield coach for the football team at Furman University from 1946 to 1951.  He was also the school's athletic director from 1949 to 1951. Meade later helped to create the Peachtree City Recreation Department and was a board member of the McIntosh Arts Council in Peachtree City, Georgia.

Meade was inducted into the University of Maryland Athletic Hall of Fame in 1982.

References

External links
 
 

1914 births
1977 deaths
American football halfbacks
Furman Paladins football coaches
Furman Paladins athletic directors
Maryland Terrapins football coaches
Maryland Terrapins football players
Maryland Terrapins men's lacrosse players
Washington Redskins players
United States Army personnel of World War II
United States Army officers
Sportspeople from Philadelphia
Paratroopers
Players of American football from Philadelphia